Thomas, Tom or Tommy Flynn may refer to:

Sportspeople
 Thomas Flynn (English footballer) (born 1990), English football goalkeeper
 Tom Flynn (Gaelic footballer) (born 1992), inter-county Gaelic footballer for Galway
 Tom Flynn (American football) (born 1962), American football player
 Tom Flynn (umpire) (died 1931), Australian cricket umpire
 Tommy Flynn, rugby league footballer of the 1930s for Wales, and Warrington

Others
 Thomas Flynn (actor) (fl. 1834), English actor and manager of the Bowery Theater
 Thomas Flynn (bishop of Achonry) (1931–2015), Irish Roman Catholic bishop
 Thomas Flynn (bishop of Ardagh) (died 1730), Irish Roman Catholic bishop
 Thomas Flynn (bishop of Lancaster) (1880–1961), English Roman Catholic bishop
 Thomas Flynn (Columban priest) (1908–1950), Irish missionary priest
 Thomas R. Flynn (born 1936), American philosopher
 Thomas Flynn (VC) (1842–1892), Victoria Cross recipient
 Tom Flynn (author) (1955–2021), American skeptic, author and journal editor
 R. Thomas Flynn (born 1938), American academic administrator
 Thomas J. Flynn (born 1930), United States Army general